Pāremoremo is a mostly rural locality about 8 km (5 miles) southwest of Albany on the northern fringe of Auckland, New Zealand. Coatesville is about 7 km to the north, and Riverhead is about 8 km to the west. Pāremoremo is home to New Zealand's only maximum security prison.

Demographics

Pāremoremo had a population of 3,360 at the 2018 New Zealand census, an increase of 117 people (3.6%) since the 2013 census, and an increase of 666 people (24.7%) since the 2006 census. There were 936 households, comprising 1,860 males and 1,497 females, giving a sex ratio of 1.24 males per female, with 591 people (17.6%) aged under 15 years, 735 (21.9%) aged 15 to 29, 1,689 (50.3%) aged 30 to 64, and 342 (10.2%) aged 65 or older.

Ethnicities were 78.0% European/Pākehā, 13.7% Māori, 5.0% Pacific peoples, 10.4% Asian, and 1.9% other ethnicities. People may identify with more than one ethnicity.

The percentage of people born overseas was 29.0, compared with 27.1% nationally.

Although some people chose not to answer the census's question about religious affiliation, 55.4% had no religion, 33.4% were Christian, 1.5% had Māori religious beliefs, 1.5% were Hindu, 0.7% were Muslim, 0.9% were Buddhist and 2.1% had other religions.

Of those at least 15 years old, 609 (22.0%) people had a bachelor's or higher degree, and 333 (12.0%) people had no formal qualifications. 753 people (27.2%) earned over $70,000 compared to 17.2% nationally. The employment status of those at least 15 was that 1,482 (53.5%) people were employed full-time, 402 (14.5%) were part-time, and 102 (3.7%) were unemployed.

Parks and reserves
Paremoremo Scenic Reserve is a block of land north of the Paremoremo residential area. It is the largest bush reserve in the North Shore and is a site of ecological significance.

A  block of land south of the prison was bought by North Shore City for NZ$3.1 million in February 2002, to be developed as Sanders Park. The park was finished in 2010, for a total budget of $2.7 million, including a $1.2 million toilet block, a fenced offleash dog walking area, mountain bike trails, a small children's bike track, and a fenced paddock for equestrians. Also at Sanders Reserve are two small beaches with good swimming areas. People have been known to camp on the grass areas around the beach.

History

Pāremoremo is the location where Te Ākitai Waiohua ancestor and grandmother of Kiwi Tāmaki, Rangi-hua-moa, ate the final moa eggs known to Tāmaki Māori.

Pāremoremo was originally a small community on the Upper Waitematā Harbour which saw European settlement grow following the construction of a wharf at the foot of Attwood Road. In the early 19th century it was known for its farms, market gardens and orchards. Passengers and cargo travelled to the city by the launches and small ferries of the period.

In the mid 1960s it became the home of Auckland Prison, New Zealand's main maximum security prison.

A village of 130 houses was built by the Ministry of Justice to house prison workers, but 30 of the houses were sold in 1996 after battles in the Employment Court of New Zealand and Court of Appeal.

Education
The school opened in 1923 as Paremoremo School, and changed its name to Ridgeview in 2000.

Notes

External links
Ridgeview School website

Populated places in the Auckland Region
North Shore, New Zealand
Populated places around the Waitematā Harbour